Juliette Rose Fretté (born December 25, 1983) is an American comedian, writer, artist, activist, and model. Known as "The Naughty Feminist", in 2017, she began writing for National Lampoon and Weekly Humorist, headlining with her spoof series "The Adventures of Angry Vagina".

The Playmate of the Month for the June 2008 issue of Playboy magazine, as a UCLA undergrad, Fretté first posed nude for Playboys October 2005 issue, "Girls of the Pac-10". She was featured in the Playboy Cyber Club as a Coed of the Week (January 2006) and Coed of the Month (March 2006) under the name "Juliette Rose".

As a writer, she is featured several times in The Huffington Post, Whitehot Magazine of Contemporary Art, and Music & Lit Review.  Known as Playboy's 'Feminist Playmate', she has written on a wealth of feminist topics via Examiner, beginning a 'Women's Issues' column on March 13, 2009.

References

External links 
 
 Juliette Fretté on Instagram

1983 births
Living people
University of California, Los Angeles alumni
2000s Playboy Playmates